is a private women's junior college in Nagasaki, Japan, established in 1966. The predecessor of the school was founded in 1896.

External links
 Official website 

Japanese junior colleges
Educational institutions established in 1896
Private universities and colleges in Japan
Universities and colleges in Nagasaki Prefecture
1896 establishments in Japan